Ikki Tousen is an anime television series based on the manga by Yuji Shiozaki, published by Wani Books and serialized in the seinen manga magazine Comic GUM. The anime is produced by J.C.Staff, directed by Takashi Watanabe, series composition by Takao Yoshioka, music by Hiroshi Motokura and Project IKKI, characters by Shinya Hasegawa, and produced by Nobuhiro Osawa and Yuji Matsukura. The series aired 13 episodes on AT-X from July 30 to October 22, 2003, with subsequent runs on TVK, Mie TV, Chiba TV, TV Saitama, and Sun Television. The opening theme is "Drivin' Through The Night" by M.o.v.e while the two ending themes are "Let me be with you" by Shela for episodes 1-7, and Fate by Masumi Asano for episodes 8-13. The series was licensed in North America by Geneon Entertainment and Enoki Films. The series is now licensed by Funimation Entertainment. The series is also licensed in Australia and New Zealand by Madman Entertainment and in the United Kingdom by MVM Films.


Episode list

Home Media release

Japanese
Seven DVD volumes were released by Media Factory between November 22, 2003 and May 25, 2004. A DVD box set was later released on January 25, 2008, and a Blu-ray box set was released on April 27, 2011.

English
Geneon Entertainment and Enoki Films released the series on four DVD volumes between August 10, 2004 and March 1, 2005. A box set was later released on July 19, 2005 by Geneon.

Funimation Entertainment released a box set of the series on May 26, 2009.

Notes

References

2003 Japanese television seasons
Ikki Tousen